Qurajome is a town in the southwestern Bakool region of Somalia.

References
Qurajome, Bakool, Somalia

Populated places in Bakool